Georgia May King (born 18 November 1986) is a Scottish actress.

Early life
Born in Edinburgh, King is the daughter of Australian actor Jonathan Hyde and Scottish opera singer Isobel Buchanan.

Career
Although King grew up dreaming of being a director, she got her break into acting when she was 18 and still working at a cheese shop, making her professional debut as Rosamond Oliver in Jane Eyre. It was her very first audition "and I booked it," she said. "I was like, 'Oh my Lord, this is amazing!'"  However, she was nearly unable to play the role. A source stated that "a week before the day she began filming, King felt stomach pains, then had her appendix rupture. Her agent told the producers that she was unlikely to recover from the operation to remove it for at least ten days." Another actress was cast, but King recovered in time and was able to get the required medical clearance to film.

She is best known as Goldie, a surrogate mother in the American sitcom, The New Normal. Formerly, she was well known for her acclaimed performance as the tyrannical head-girl Harriet Bentley in 2008's Wild Child, and as cruel, conniving Sophie in the 2009 slasher film Tormented. Also in 2009 King received positive acclaim for her performance as the manipulative Victoria in the film Tanner Hall. She also performed in One Night in November at the Belgrade Theatre in Coventry, from October to November 2010, as well as being featured in the 2011 film Chalet Girl. She appeared as Princess Elena in the episode "The Changeling" of the third series of the BBC's Merlin. She appeared in the comedy horror film Cockneys vs Zombies as a bank robbery hostage trying to escape from a zombie-infested London.

King also appeared as series regular Amanda Snodgrass across both seasons in the 2016–2017 HBO comedy Vice Principals.

Filmography

Film

Television

References

External links
 
 

1986 births
Living people
Scottish film actresses
Scottish television actresses
21st-century Scottish actresses
People educated at Exeter School
Scottish people of Australian descent
Actresses from Edinburgh